The Huntresses (lit. "Joseon Beautiful Lady Three Musketeers") is a 2014 South Korean film directed by Park Jae-hyun. A Charlie's Angels-inspired action/adventure comedy, it stars Ha Ji-won, Kang Ye-won and Son Ga-in as the three most legendary bounty hunters in the Joseon dynasty.

Plot
The intelligent and talented martial arts swordswoman Jin-ok (Ha Ji-won), housewife and fighter Hong-dan (Kang Ye-won), and Ga-bi (Son Ga-in), the youngest of the trio: These three women are the Joseon dynasty's top bounty hunters, and they never fail to capture a target, no matter the criminal or the crime. They set out on a secret mission commissioned by the king to search for the stauroscope, and in doing so, prevent a powerful group from gaining absolute power and overturning the royal family.

Cast

References

External links
  
 
 
 
 Watch The Huntresses on MidnightPulp (English subtitles)

2014 action comedy films
South Korean action adventure films
Films set in the Joseon dynasty
Showbox films
2010s Korean-language films
2010s South Korean films